Naval Base Guam is a strategic U.S. naval base located on Apra Harbor and occupying the Orote Peninsula. In 2009, it was combined with Andersen Air Force Base to form Joint Region Marianas, which is a Navy-controlled joint base.

The Ship Repair Facility, Guam, was located next to Naval Base Guam, along Apra Harbor. It was closed in 1997, due to the recommendation of the 1995 Base Realignment and Closure Commission.

Naval Base Guam is home to Commander Submarine Squadron 15, Coast Guard Sector Guam, and Naval Special Warfare Unit One, and supports 28 other tenant commands. It is the home base to dozens of Pacific Command, Pacific Fleet, Seventh Fleet, and Seabee units.

 is stationed in Guam to tend the submarines of the Seventh Fleet, and  changed from Naval Support Facility Diego Garcia to Naval Base Guam to fulfill the same role.

History 
On July 21, 1944, also known as Liberation Day, American forces declared the island secure from the Japanese Army. The construction was started by the Navy's Lion Six. Seabees from the 5th Naval Construction Brigade built the base on the site of the destroyed US Marine Corps barracks in Sumay, Apra Harbor. 

The Navy code named the type of base the Seabees built for its size and purpose, i.e Oak, Acorn, Lion and Cub. A Lion was a main base for the fleet. Naval base Guam was the first named Naval Operating Base and later nicknamed The Pacific Supermarket. In recent years, expansion of the base has been opposed by many locals in Guam.

Homeported submarines

Sub-installations

Sub-installations aboard Naval Base Guam include Camp Covington. Camp Covington is one of the three main body deployment locations for the Navy Seabees. Currently, Camp Covington is a deployment site in the rotation of the three Seabee battalions making up the 30th Naval Construction Regiment. The 7th Fleet's Navy Expeditionary Forces Command Pacific is also headquartered here.

The camp has a gym, a cardio hall, and a mini-mart. It has its own barracks for Officers, Enlisted, and Chief Petty Officers; a galley, an armory, dental clinic, and various HQ buildings and warehouses.

Other commands
 Military Sealift Command Ship Support Unit Guam
 Navy Explosive Ordnance Disposal (EOD) Mobile Unit FIVE
 Navy Munitions Command East Asia Division Unit Guam
 Naval Airborne Weapons Maintenance Unit 1
 Naval Computer and Telecommunications Station Guam
 THIRTIETH Naval Construction Regiment

Services
Naval Base Guam has amenities and services including a library, chapel, visitor's quarters, theater, and bowling lanes.

See also
 Ordnance Annex
 US military installations in Guam
 
United States Navy submarine bases

History:
World War II United States Merchant Navy
 Naval Advance Base Saipan
 Naval Advance Base Espiritu Santo

References

External links

Official website
Military: Naval Air Station, Agana (Tiyan) (closed). GlobalSecurity.org. Retrieved 2010-02-19.
Historic American Engineering Record documentation:

Historic American Engineering Record in Guam
Guam
Military installations of the United States in Guam
United States Navy installations
Apra Harbor
Orote Peninsula
Santa Rita, Guam
Guam Highway 1
1944 establishments in Guam